Tsalenjikha (Ċalenjixis municiṗaliṫeṫi) is a district of Georgia, in the region of Samegrelo-Zemo Svaneti. Its main town is Tsalenjikha. Tsalenjikha Municipality is located in the valleys of the Enguri and Chanistskali rivers, the area is 646.7 km2, the population is 26,158 people (2014). The municipality includes 14 administrative units, including 2 cities Tsalenjikha and Jvari.

History 
Tsalenjikha, Megrelian "Tsendikha", Chanistskali Megrelian "Tsentskari" River and such names of the geographical point are confirmed by both Georgian and foreign sources. Tsalenjikha and its environs were the original settlement of western Georgian tribes.

It is known from historical sources that the territory of the municipality was inhabited even when people used stone and bronze tools. Western Georgian tribes have been living on the territory of Tsalenjikha since that time. This is indicated by the names of this point and the river "Chelenjikha", "Tsendikha" Tsalenjikha.

In the 10th and 11th centuries, Tsalenjikha was an important settlement, as evidenced by such a large and important church as the Church of the Transfiguration. From this time on, the importance of Tsalenjikha gradually increased so that by the 13th and 14th centuries it became the only residence of the Dadiani. Here they had a palace, utensils (treasures) and apparently a ancestral tomb as well. Such an increase in the importance of Tsalenjikha led to the relocation of one of the most important dioceses of Odisha to Tsalenjikha in the 14th century. The relocation of the episcopal center to Tsalenjikha led to large-scale construction, as well as the painting of the Tsalenjikha Church during the 14th century during the reign of Vamek Dadiani (1384–1396).

Ak. Simon Janashia undoubtedly believes that 'Tseni' or 'Tsani' 'was one of the tribes of the Chanuri-Megrelian branch and not their own Zani'. (Tsen-Dikha) and the river that flowed into the castle (Tsen-water).

Materials about Tsalenjikha's past are taken from Inga Lortkipanidze's book - Tsalenjikha Painting, by Simon Janashia and Shota Meskhia.

In 2001, the village of Lia was the site of the Lia radiological accident.

Historical sites

 Tsalenjikha Cathedral
 The ruins of Gamajistsikhe
 Katskhara Fortress
 Samikao Cave
 Episcopal Church
 Jagiri Castle
 St. Barbara's Church
 Uluria Castle
 "Mamukia Tower"
 "Dilakirse" fortress
 The ruins of Skuri Castle
 The ruins of Lesale Castle
 Jgali conical tower
 St. Nicholas Church in Jgali
 Church of the All-Holy Mother of God on the Cross
 Omune Castle-Tower

Politics

Tsalenjikha Municipal Assembly (Georgian: წალენჯიხის საკრებულო) is a representative body in Tsalenjikha Municipality. The council assembles into session regularly, to consider subject matters such as code changes, utilities, taxes, city budget, oversight of Municipal government and more. Tsalenjikha Sakrebulo is elected every four year. The last election was held in October 2021.

Tsalenjikha was one of only seven municipalities where ruling Georgian Dream party failed to gain a majority. After several attempts, the opposition parties UNM, For Georgia and Lelo agreed on a chairman of the Sakrebulo, four weeks after neighboring municipality Chkhorotsqu did the same.

Results in local election
Municipal Assembly

{| class="wikitable" style="text-align:right"
|-
! colspan="2" rowspan="2" |Party
! colspan="3" |Party list
! colspan="3" |Constituency
! rowspan="2" |Totalseats
! rowspan="2" |+/–
|-
!Votes 
!% 
!Seats 
!Votes 
!% 
!Seats
|-
| style="background-color: #e4012e;" |
|align=left|United National Movement||5,439||37.78||7|| || || 4 || 11 ||  8
|-
| style="background-color: ;" |
|align=left|Georgian Dream||5,008||34.79||7|| || || 4 || 11 ||  13
|-
| style="background-color: #702F92" |
|align=left|For Georgia||2,730||18.96||3|| || || 1 || 4 || New
|-
| style="background-color: #FFD400" |
|align=left|Lelo||482||3.35||1|| || || || 1 || New
|-
| colspan=10 bgcolor=lightgrey | 
|-
|bgcolor=#003876|
|align=left|European Georgia || 310 || 2.15 || || || || || ||  2
|-
| style="background-color: #E7B031" |
|align=left|Alliance of Patriots||107||0.74|| || || || || ||  1
|-
| style="background-color: " |
|align=left|Labour Party||102||0.71|| || || || || || 
|-
|bgcolor=#ff0000|
|align=left|Strategy Aghmashenebeli||95||0.66|| || || || || || 
|-
| style="background-color: " |
|align=left|New Political Center - Girchi||75||0.52|| || || || || || New
|-
|style="background-color: #D3D3D3" |
|align=left|Other parties|| 47 ||0.36|| || || || ||  || 
|- 
|colspan=2 align=left|Invalid/blank votes|| || || || || || || || 
|-
|colspan=2 align=left|Total||14,395||100||18|| || ||9||27||
|-
|colspan=2 align=left|Registered voters/turnout|| 28,737||51.11|| || || || ||
|-
|align=left colspan=10|Source: CEC
|}

Mayor

Municipal Assembly 2017-2021

Notable natives

 Meliton Kantaria (1920 – 1993) – was a Georgian sergeant of the Soviet Army credited with having hoisted a Soviet flag over the Reichstag on 30 April 1945.
 Terenti Graneli (1897 – 1934) – was a noted Georgian poet.
 Aneta Dadeshkeliani (1872–1922) – was a Georgian poet, educator and social reformer.
 Nikoloz Shengelaia (1903 – 1943) - was a Soviet Georgian film director.
 Leo Kiacheli (1884 – 1963) –  was a Georgian novelist, short story writer, and journalist.
 Badri Kvaratskhelia (b. 1965) – a former Georgian footballer.
 Givi Kvaratskhelia (b. 1979) – a retired Georgian footballer.
 Georgi Tsurtsumia (b. 1980) – a wrestler who competed in the Men's Greco-Roman 120 kg at the 2004 Summer Olympics and won the silver medal.
 Khvicha Kvaratskhelia (b. 2001) – is a Georgian professional footballer who plays as a winger for the Italian Serie A side S.S.C. Napoli and the Georgia national team.

See also 
 List of municipalities in Georgia (country)

References

External links 
 Districts of Georgia, Statoids.com

Municipalities of Samegrelo-Zemo Svaneti